Elminia is a genus of bird in the flycatcher family Stenostiridae. The genus is endemic to Africa. It contains the following species:
 African blue flycatcher (Elminia longicauda)
 White-tailed blue flycatcher (Elminia albicauda)
 White-bellied crested flycatcher (Elminia albiventris)
 White-tailed crested flycatcher (Elminia albonotata)
 Dusky crested flycatcher (Elminia nigromitrata)

References

 Del Hoyo, J.; Elliot, A. & Christie D. (editors). (2006). Handbook of the Birds of the World. Volume 11: Old World Flycatchers to Old World Warblers. Lynx Edicions. .

 
Bird genera
 
Taxa named by Charles Lucien Bonaparte
Taxonomy articles created by Polbot